The German Advisory Council on Global Change (German: Wissenschaftlicher Beirat der Bundesregierung Globale Umweltveränderungen, WBGU) is an independent, scientific advisory body to the German Federal Government, established in 1992 in the run-up to the Rio Earth Summit (UNCED).

The Council's principal tasks are to:
 analyse global environment and development problems and report on these, 
 review and evaluate national and international research in the field of global change,
 provide early warning of new issue areas,
 identify gaps in research and to initiate new research,
 monitor and assess national and international policies for the achievement of sustainable development,
 elaborate recommendations for action and research and
 raise public awareness and heighten the media profile of global change issues.

The WBGU also comments on current events, such as the United Nations Climate Change conferences (e.g., in Paris 2015), the United Nations Conference on Sustainable Development (Rio+20), the adoption of the Sustainable Development Goals (2015), the United Nations Conference on Housing and Sustainable Urban Development Habitat III (2016) or Germany's G20 presidency in 2017. Meinhard Schulz-Baldes (1993–2008), Inge Paulini (2008–2017) and Maja Göpel (2017–2020) served as WBGU Secretaries-General.

Reports

Flagship reports
 Rethinking Land in the Anthropocene: from Separation to Integration (2020)
 Towards our Common Digital Future (2019)
 Humanity on the move: The transformative power of cities (2016)
 World in Transition – Governing the Marine Heritage (2013)
 World in Transition – A Social Contract for Sustainability (2011)
 World in Transition – Future Bioenergy and Sustainable Land Use (2008)
 World in Transition –  Climate Change as a Security Risk (2007)
 World in Transition – Fighting Poverty through Environmental Policy (2004)
 World in Transition – Towards Sustainable Energy Systems (2003)
 World in Transition – New Structures for Global Environmental Policy (2000)
 World in Transition –  Conservation and Sustainable Use of the Biosphere (1999)
 World in Transition – Strategies for Managing Global Environmental Risks (1998)
 World in Transition – Ways Towards Sustainable Management of Freshwater Resources (1997)
 World in Transition – The Research Challenge  (1996)
 World in Transition – Ways Towards Global Environmental Solutions (1995)
 World in Transition – The Threat to Soils (1994)
 World in Transition –  Basic Structure of Global People-Environment Interactions (1993)

Special reports

Development and justice through transformation: The Four Big 'I's  (2016)
2015 saw a historic double success for sustainability and climate policy. The 2030 Agenda for Sustainable Development, with its Sustainable Development Goals (SDGs), and the Paris Agreement on climate protection establish a system of ambitious policy goals for the world. The group of twenty major industrialized and emerging economies (G20) now needs to resolutely advance implementation of both agreements, seizing the opportunity of this 'Great Transformation' to sustainability as a unique modernization project that could offer substantial economic development opportunities. Complete decarbonization of the world economy, which is necessary to avoid the gravest climate risks, can only be achieved by profoundly transforming energy systems and other high-emissions infrastructures. This transformation could inspire Innovation and channel Investment into sustainability and climate protection, and into the kinds of sustainable Infrastructures that need to be established and expanded. At the same time, the transformation could combat inequality and promote Inclusion within societies and globally, thus becoming an equity project.

Climate Protection as a World Citizen Movement (2014)

The 5th Assessment Report of the Intergovernmental Panel on Climate Change (IPCC) makes it unmistakably clear: unacceptable climatic consequences, which are likely to escalate beyond the 2°C guard rail, can only be avoided if further increases in greenhouse-gas concentrations are halted as soon as possible. The WBGU therefore recommends reducing  emissions from fossil fuels to zero by 2070 at the latest. This policy goal is both ambitious and incisive, because 'the zero target must be reached' by every country, every municipality, every company and every citizen if the world as a whole is to become climate-neutral. However, the 2°C line can only be held if a large proportion of stakeholders – especially the OECD countries – start reducing their emissions much earlier. Global society as a whole has only a very limited carbon budget at its disposal; emissions should therefore peak by 2020 if possible, or in the third decade at the latest. In this report the WBGU outlines a two-pronged strategy for global climate protection based on interaction between multilateralism and civil society. To achieve this, on the one hand the Paris Climate Agreement targeted for late 2015 should exhibit certain characteristics set out by the WBGU. In particular, a process should be agreed to ensure compliance with the 2°C guard rail. On the other hand, all social actors should make their specific contributions towards decarbonization. In this way, an intricate responsibility architecture for the future of our planet can emerge in which vertical delegating and horizontal engagement are not contradictions, but complementary factors that reinforce each other.

Solving the climate dilemma: The budget approach (2009)

At their meeting in the Italian city of L'Aquila in July 2009, the heads of state and governments of the G8 countries and the Major Economies Forum on Energy and Climate (MEF), whose members include India, Brazil and China, acknowledged the importance that global warming must not exceed the 2°C guard rail if dangerous climate change is to be avoided. WBGU views this as an extremely important step towards the adoption of a binding international agreement which establishes a well-founded target for global climate protection. The task now is to build on this consensus and reach agreement, at Copenhagen, on a follow-up treaty to the Kyoto Protocol, which is due to expire in 2012. This new international agreement should translate the relevant scientific knowledge into a fair and practicable global strategy to combat global warming. So far, however, the lack of unanimity between the countries involved in the negotiating process has meant that there is no clear leitmotif pointing the way towards such an agreement.

The Future Oceans: Warming Up, Rising High, Turning Sour (2006)
Latest research findings show that failure to check mankind's emissions of carbon dioxide will have severe consequences for the world's oceans. The marine environment is doubly affected: continuing warming and ongoing acidification both pose threats. In combination with overfishing, these two threats are further jeopardizing already weakened fish stocks. Sea-level rise is exposing coastal regions to mounting flood and hurricane risks. To keep the adverse effects on human society and ecosystems within manageable limits, it will be essential to adopt new coastal protection approaches, designate marine protected areas and agree on ways to deal with refugees from endangered coastal areas. All such measures, however, can only succeed if global warming and ocean acidification are combated vigorously. Ambitious climate protection is therefore a key precondition to successful marine conservation and coastal protection.

Climate Protection Strategies for the 21st Century. Kyoto and Beyond (2003)
With this special report, the WBGU provides recommendations for future negotiations within the context of the United Nations Framework Convention on Climate Change (UNFCCC), particularly relating to the Kyoto Protocol to the Convention. The report centres on three questions:
What is 'dangerous climate change' within the meaning of Article 2 of the UNFCCC?
Which socio-economically and technologically viable pathways are available to prevent such dangerous climate change?
How can all countries be integrated equitably within a system of emissions reduction commitments?
The report concentrates on the potentials to reduce the emissions of carbon dioxide, this being the principal anthropogenic greenhouse gas. The analysis focuses, on the one hand, on the economic and technological potentials to reduce energy and industry related emissions and, on the other hand, on the relevance of biological sinks of carbon dioxide and the options to preserve them. Finally, based on this analysis, the report contains specific recommendations on ways to shape political and economic instruments in the second commitment period of the Kyoto Protocol.

Charging the Use of Global Commons (2002)
Global common resources like international airspace and the high seas are in danger of overexploitation because the users need not bear the full social costs of their actions. The CO2-emissions of international aviation and of shipping are not subject to the quantitative reduction obligations of the Kyoto Protocol. Imposing user charges can close this regulatory gap and induce environment-related incentive effects to reduce environmental damage. Moreover, additional financial resources are generated, which should be earmarked for the protection and conservation of global common goods. In this special report, the WBGU makes recommendations for a politically viable implementation of the concept of global user charges for three specific areas of application:
   Charges on the use of airspace by aviation,
   Charges on the use of the oceans by shipping,
   Payments for non utilisation obligations.

Environment and Ethics (1999)
Should people be allowed to do everything they want? Should humankind be allowed to use nature and the environment completely for its own ends? More and more people are questioning the limits of human intervention in nature. What is ethically allowed and what should be prohibited? The WBGU offers some answers to these difficult questions. At the same time it has drawn up a number of principles, which should not be violated, even where there are big economical gains. In addition, in a democratic and culturally diverse society it is the task of ethics to lay down generally binding criteria for balancing between nature-related and, for example, economic matters. With these tools of ethical and economic criteria the Federal Government of Germany could support the interests of environmental protection at the international level.

The Accounting of Biological Sinks and Sources Under the Kyoto Protocol: A Step Forwards or Backwards for Global Environmental Protection? (1998)

Targets for Climate Protection 1997
This statement was issued on the occasion of the Third Conference of the Parties to the United Nations Framework Convention on Climate Change (the Climate Convention, FCCC), and contains recommendations on the commitments to be agreed upon in a protocol to the Convention. According to the "Berlin Mandate" adopted at the first Conference of the Parties, the commitments of the industrialized countries listed in Annex I of the Climate Convention are to be strengthened by setting quantified limitation and reduction objectives within specified time frames for their greenhouse gas (GHG) emissions. These measures are aimed at achieving the ultimate objective of the FCCC, namely a "stabilization of greenhouse gas concentrations in the atmosphere at a level that would prevent dangerous anthropogenic interference with the climate system".

Scenario for the derivation of global CO2-reduction targets and implementation strategies (1995)

The WBGU derives a global CO2 reduction target by using an "inverse scenario" based on simplified models for climate dynamics and the carbon cycle. By first analysing the maximum stress levels caused by climate change that one can assume to be ecologically and economically bearable, a "tolerance window" for the future climatic development is deduced. In a further step, the set of admissible emission profiles is determined, i.e., those global CO2 emission functions which keep the climate system within the demarcated window. Among the so-defined family of emission options a specific strategy is finally singled out by feasibility criteria. The WBGU believes that such an integrated assessment of the climate change problem in the "backwards mode" has several advantages in comparison with the straightforward approach. It has to be emphasised, however, that the analysis employs a number of assumptions and approximations and therefore has the character of a "Gedankenexperiment".

Policy papers

Beyond Climate Neutrality (2021)
The climate crisis and the crises caused by the COVID-19 pandemic must be tackled together. Many countries are working on strategies to implement the Paris Agreement. At the climate conference in Glasgow, therefore, it will be imperative to reconcile short- and long-term goals and measures. In the paper, the WBGU recommends making national long-term strategies a key topic at the Glasgow climate conference in order to provide orientation for current climate policy. Up to now, countries have only been obliged to submit short-term 'nationally determined contributions' (NDCs) to climate-change mitigation. These need to become far more ambitious and to start promoting policies conducive to achieving the goals of the Paris Agreement.

A European Way to our Common Digital Future
Particularly during its presidency of the Council of the EU in 2020, Germany should build upon the Green Deal announced by EU Commission President Ursula von der Leyen and work towards a close integration of digital change and sustainability. The new EU Parliament and the new European Commission should also pursue this goal. To this end the WBGU presents 7 cornerstones of a European way to a common digital future:

 Integrate the opportunities and risks of digitalization into EU sustainability policy: The EU needs an implementation strategy for the SDGs that also places digital technologies at the service of sustainability and addresses its risks. In the same way, digitalization should be embedded in the 8th Environmental Action Programme from 2021 onwards. 
 Actively shape digital policy in line with sustainability goals: Ecological and social aimsthat can be reached through digitalization shouldbe pursued with equal emphasis, e.g. via the European Digital Agenda, the European Commission's Strategy for Artificial Intelligence (AI), or measures within the framework of the Digital Europe programme. Negative (side) effects should be identified and minimized at an early stage.
 Involve the private sector more in the provision of data: Up to now, EU data policy has concentrated on the protection of personal data and the use of data from public authorities. This does not go far enough: accessibility to, and the re-use of (non-personal) private-sector data should also be improved in order to create data that can be used for the common good and digitalized (knowledge) assets. 
 Develop and apply artificial intelligence in a sustainable way: The EU should be consistent in following its value-based approach in the application and development of AI systems: fundamental rights, human dignity, environmental and sustainability principles are the normative foundation of the EU and non-negotiable. There is an urgent need for (framework) legislation on the development and handling of AI, since ethical guidelines and debates alone are not enough to ensure a corresponding development and application. In addition, research on explainable and secure, i.e. reliably verified and validated, AI should be promoted and used to ensure trustworthy, fair and accountable procedures.
 Ensure access to digital commons and basic services through public-service information and communication technology (ICT) infrastructures: Individual inclusion, personal development, environmental protection, fair competition and a functioning digital public sphere require access to data and services such as cloud services, mobility platforms or a search index. Their almost exclusively private-sector provision is not always in the interests of the common good. The EU's task should be to create or ensure public-service digital and digitalized infrastructures to make data and information accessible for the common good and to offer alternative (basic) services under public law.
 Gear EU research policy and promotion of innovations consistently towards sustainability goals: Responsible Research and Innovation (RRI) should be applied as an overarching concept of European research and innovation policy in order to explicitly embed the orientation towards sustainability goals and to avoid unintended impacts. The high levels of protection of the environment, consumers and occupational health and safety in the EU must not be weakened by the innovation principle currently under discussion. Horizon Europe's missions should aim to integrate digital change and the Transformation towards Sustainability and strengthen transformative and transformation research.
 European digitalization model as a priority in foreign policy: The EU should also promote the integration of sustainability and digitalization internationally. It should initiate a summit on 'Sustainability in the Digital Age', e.g. for 2022, symbolically 30 years after the Earth Summit in Rio, to set the course for the necessary continuation of the sustainability agenda until 2030 and beyond.

Digital Momentum for the UN Sustainability Agenda in the 21st Century

Global digital change should be designed to support the implementation of the 2030 Agenda with its Sustainable Development Goals (SDGs). Up to now, hopes that digitalization would make a contribution to achieving these goals has not materialized. Only if digital change and the Transformation towards Sustainability are constructively interlinked can we make progress with environmental protection, climate-change mitigation and human development. The WBGU would like to introduce into the discussion four ideas directly related to the Sustainable Development Goals (SDGs). First: promote a global (environmental) awareness among people worldwide by providing a stronger future-proof education. The focus should be on enabling people to actively shape digital change and the Transformation towards Sustainability. Open data relating to sustainability and virtual learning environments are important elements for experiencing ecosystems. In concrete terms, an integrated programme for future-proof education should be developed, UN processes should be opened up to citizen-science projects, and an International Information Union should be founded to collect, process and publish sustainability-related data. Second, establish a digitally enhanced circular economy. The transition from linear and resource-intensive value chains to a near-complete circular economy is a key component of the Transformation towards Sustainability. Digital data acquisition and processing offer great potential for this. Environmentally harmful emissions and resource depletion should be recorded across all sectors of the economy and value chains, and greater efforts should be made to implement the 3Rs strategy (reduce, reuse, recycle) at the international level. Third, modernize sustainability policy itself by using digital solutions. Digitally enhanced governance can help improve the transparency of political actions, as well as the participation and worldwide networking of political actors. Coordination within the UN system should be intensified by establishing a 'UN Digitalization Initiative'; a 'UN Framework Convention on Digital Sustainability and Sustainable Digitalization' should be negotiated; and a globally uniform set of indicators for the SDGs should be developed to facilitate the comparability and verifiability of national reports. Fourth, further develop the global sustainability agenda beyond 2030 against the background of the opportunities and risks of the Digital Age. The UN should prepare for these future challenges in good time. The WBGU recommends convening a UN summit on 'Sustainability in the Digital Age' in 2022 – 30 years after the Earth Summit in Rio de Janeiro – to set the course for continuing the sustainability agenda beyond 2030. A key outcome could be the adoption of a charter entitled 'Towards Our Common Digital Future'.

Just & In–Time Climate Policy: Four Initiatives for Fairness (2018)
Limiting global warming to well below 2°C requires the rapid decarbonization of the global economy. If this enterprise fails, we will jeopardize the life-support systems of future generations. The longer the transformation towards climate compatibility is delayed, the more severe the risks and damage will be for a growing number of people. The transformation requirements and the damage caused by climate change have an unequal temporal, geographical and social distribution – as do the respective possibilities for dealing with them. The WBGU therefore proposes a just & in-time transformation that takes into account all people affected, empowers them, holds those responsible for climate change accountable, and creates both global and national prospects for the future. The WBGU proposes that the German Federal Government should promote four exemplary initiatives of a just & in-time climate policy targeting (1) the people affected by the structural change towards climate compatibility (e.g. in coal-mining regions), (2) the legal rights of people harmed by climate change, (3) the dignified migration of people who lose their native countries due to climate change, and (4) the creation of financing instruments for just & in-time transformation processes.

Human progress within planetary guard rails. A contribution to the SDG debate (2014)

The year 2015 has special importance for the transformation towards sustainable development. New Sustainable Development Goals (SDGs) are then supposed to replace the Millennium Development Goals (MDGs). The aim is to offer a new orientation for political action in the coming decades. The WBGU recommends orienting the new catalogue of goals towards the key message of the 1992 Earth Summit: that development and environmental protection must be considered together and do not contradict each other. The SDGs should not be reduced to poverty eradication, but must address all dimensions of sustainable development. In particular, global environmental change must be incorporated, otherwise even poverty eradication will become impossible. Up to now, too little attention has been paid to this link in the ongoing discourse on SDGs. Although many reports mention the concept of planetary guard rails or planetary boundaries, they do not back this up with specific targets. The WBGU presents recommendations on how guard rails for global environmental problems should be incorporated in the SDG catalogue and operationalized by means of corresponding targets.

Financing the Global Energy-System Transformation (2012)

The world faces the challenge of a global transformation to sustainable energy systems. Substantial up-front investments are needed to improve energy efficiency and switch to renewable energies. At the same time, these investments offer great opportunities, because strategic innovations can be triggered and new markets can develop in the course of the transformation process. Savings on the cost of fossil fuels in conventional technologies could completely offset the investment in renewable energy technologies and energy efficiency by as early as 2040. The private capital needed for the transformation is available and can be mobilised if a suitable political framework is put into place. A corresponding regulatory policy should be introduced to make such investment more attractive for the private sector. The WBGU advocates a proactive state that integrates energy, environmental and climate policy; this could reduce existing investment risks by developing a stable, long-term transformative regulatory framework. At the same time, policy makers should expand the opportunities for participation. Germany is currently leading this transformation, both in terms of technological innovations and in the creation of a suitable policy framework. Our country is able to give the world an example of how the Energiewende (energy-system transformation) can generate more, not less prosperity.

Climate Policy Post-Copenhagen: A Three-Level Strategy for Success (2010)

International climate policy post-Copenhagen is in crisis. There is currently no prospect of the comprehensive and binding UN climate treaty – the outcome hoped for at the 2009 UN Climate Change Conference – being achieved within the foreseeable future. However, in order to keep the global mean temperature rise below 2°C by the end of the century, a resolute course must be set in the international climate process within the next few years. The WBGU recommends that in order to revitalise the multilateral climate process, policy-makers and civil society in Europe take on a self-confident leading role in global alliances with selected 'climate pioneer' countries and that more intensive support be provided for civil society initiatives. The aim of establishing a binding international regime to limit CO2 emissions – based, for example, on the WBGU's own budget approach and similar approaches now also being discussed in China and India – must remain in place. The following recommendations are directed primarily towards the German Government in light of its role in the international arena, particularly within the European Union (EU), at intergovernmental level via its bilateral and multilateral cooperation, and in the United Nations context.

New impetus for climate policy: Making the most of Germany's dual presidency (2007)

If dangerous climate change is still to be avoided, a reversal of current trends must be achieved within the next ten years, and greenhouse gas emissions worldwide must be halved by 2050 compared with a 1990 baseline. However, there is a widening gap between the action that is urgently needed and current climate policy. The WBGU is therefore convinced that a new climate policy dynamic is required worldwide and that Germany's double presidency of the European Union and P of G8 offers a dual opportunity to drive climate protection forward. The WBGU's core messages are:
Climate protection is both worthwhile and feasible: Investing in climate protection is economically efficient, as the costs of effective climate protection are far lower than the costs of inaction.
Further development of the UN climate convention: A consensus on the mitigation target must be forged and enshrined in the convention. To this end, the WBGU recommends the adoption of a global temperature guard rail limiting the rise in near-surface air temperature to a maximum of 2°C relative to the pre-industrial value – equivalent to stabilizing the concentration of greenhouse gases below 450 ppm eq.
Making the most of the G8 Summit at Heiligendamm: Fresh initiatives from the heads of state and government are required to inject new life into the faltering climate process.
Reaffirming the European Union's leading role: The European Union should expand its leading role in international climate protection.

Development needs Environmental Protection: Recommendations for the Millennium + 5 Summit (2005)
The Millennium + 5 Summit will review progress towards the achievement of the Millennium Development Goals (MDGs) and take stock of the United Nations' capacity to act. The Summit offers the opportunity to set a new course in international poverty reduction and initiate a reform of the UN. If the MDGs fail, international cooperation will be plunged into crisis. Yet the current poverty debate tends to overlook the environmental problems which exacerbate poverty in many developing countries. The international community should therefore remind itself of the message sent out by the Earth Summit in Rio de Janeiro in 1992: environmental and development policies are inextricably linked. WBGU's core recommendations are:
Linking poverty reduction with environmental policy: The MDGs cannot be achieved without environmental protection measures. Environmental policy is therefore a prerequisite for development and must be a key element in any long-term poverty reduction strategy. Conversely, the global environment cannot be protected without development policy.
Forging strategic partnerships with anchor countries: Due to their size and dynamic economies, developing countries such as China, Brazil and India play a key role both in global environmental changes and in poverty reduction. The strategic foci of development cooperation with these countries must be placed accordingly.
Reforming the development and environment policy architecture: The division of labour in international development policy should be improved and the fragmentation of the multilateral development and environment institutions overcome. In the medium term, a new Council on Global Development and Environment should replace the United Nations Economic and Social Council (ECOSOC).
Increasing the funding commitments: The international community should invest more intensively in poverty reduction and environmental protection: the costs of inaction would be significantly higher. As well as increasing funds committed to development cooperation, new financing instruments, such as charges for the use of global common goods, should be introduced.

Renewable energies for sustainable development: Impulses for renewables 2004

Energy is a key theme for future world development. Worldwide energy demand is mounting rapidly, particularly in the developing and newly industrialising countries, which seek to catch up with the level of economic development attained by industrialised countries. The great challenge now is to meet this energy demand in a sustainable manner. However, sustainable development will be inconceivable without a deep-seated reconfiguration of worldwide energy systems. One goal in this context must be to protect natural life-support systems and, in particular, to prevent dangerous anthropogenic perturbation of the climate system. If the present path continues and rising energy demand is met mainly from fossil sources, this would trigger intolerable global climate change with high consequential costs, and would thus also jeopardize economic development. A second necessary goal is to eradicate energy poverty in developing countries in order that these countries can make use of development opportunities. It is essential that 2.4 billion people gain access to modern forms of energy so that they can shake off the yoke of energy poverty. To attain these two goals, energy systems need to be turned towards sustainability. To that end, efficiency must be improved at all levels of the energy system, and fossil energy sources must be substituted by renewable ones. The potential of renewable energies, above all solar energy, is almost unlimited and can be harnessed sustainably. Energy system transformation towards sustainability is thus the first step into the solar age. However, without rapid and resolute international policy support, the expansion of renewable energy sources will not be able to develop the necessary dynamics in time. The International Conference for Renewable Energies (renewables 2004) held in Bonn 2004 is a milestone for this process.

Charging the Use of Global Commons (2002)
In this policy paper, the WBGU summarizes the key findings of its special report on user charges within the framework of global sustainability policy, and makes recommendations for a politically viable implementation of the concept of global user charges for three specific areas of application:
  Charges on the use of airspace by aviation,
  Charges on the use of the oceans by shipping,
  Payments for non utilization obligations.

The Johannesburg Opportunity: Key Elements of a Negotiation Strategy (2001)
Johannesburg in South Africa is a symbolically important venue for the World Summit on Sustainable Development (WSSD). No other continent has been affected worse by the impacts of global change and exhibits in such representative form the critical environmental and socioeconomic situation facing many developing countries. At the same time, the host nation epitomizes new hopes and beginnings following the radical changes it has undergone in recent years. A new beginning is necessary at the international level, too, given the further deterioration in the state of the global environment since the 1992 United Nations Conference on Environment and Development (UNCED) in Rio de Janeiro. New problems have arisen and the most critical remain unsolved. The WSSD to be held in September 2002 in Johannesburg provides the international community with yet another opportunity to set the future direction of international environment and development policy. In the run-up to this event, the WBGU would like to focus the attention of the Federal Government of Germany on some crucial issues where decisions in Johannesburg could help to eliminate critical shortcomings in current environment and development policy. A great deal has been achieved in the field of global environmental policymaking since 1992, in particular the international conventions and treaties dealing with a range of global environmental problems such as climate change, loss of biodiversity, desertification, or the impacts of persistent organic pollutants. In the view of the WBGU, the Johannesburg summit should therefore refrain from detailed negotiations on these topics. However, it must be possible to provide new ideas and inspiration, to close gaps and loopholes, and to take the various conventions a stage further.

Quotes about WBGU reports 

"The reports of the German Advisory Council on Global Change (WBGU) are an indispensable reference and resource on global environmental change policies. Every scientist, decision-maker and institution concerned with the pressing issue of environment and development should have them."

Prof. Dr. Klaus Töpfer, Executive Director of the United Nations Environment Programme (UNEP) 1998–2006

"Humanity on the move: Unlocking the transformative power of cities, is a notable breath of fresh air at a time when shallow platitudes seem the order of the day. It is bold, meticulously crafted through argument (as opposed to assertion) and evidence, and rooted in a highly original conceptual framework that is both global in scope and differentiated. The report asserts the centrality of cultural and institutional change and does not shy away from being specific and programmatic at a moment when it seems that political discourses are increasingly disconnected from our highly fractious, unsustainable, violent and intolerant times. I recommend it as compulsory reading in the strongest possible terms."

Professor Edgar Pieterse, Director – African Centre for Cities (University of Cape Town) & Chairperson of the Cities Alliance Think Tank.

"The geopolitical world is changing beyond recognition. The challenge of ensuring that in the future people can live better than today, while doing so within the Planetary Boundaries has yet to be met.  Markets and the environment are increasingly globalized.  Social protection and the search for equity are not, though there are interesting signs of change.  There are many international institutions, but few are global.  We have known for some time the necessary individual solutions required for the transition.  Now, the WBGU report 'World in Transition – A Social Contract for Sustainability' offers us extremely interesting ideas on how we can bring all this together collectively through a new social contract that is global, equitable and green, and requires a new kind of global citizenship: the first steps toward a global political project for global sustainability."

Janos Pasztor, Executive Secretary UN Secretary-General's High-level Panel on Global Sustainability 2010–12

"Biofuels have been represented by some as a silver bullet to the climate change threat, and by others as a fatal mistake set to destroy forests and increase hunger; they are neither. Sane and sensibly developed they offer a chance to reduce emissions, generate employment and diversify rural livelihoods. But widespread commercialisation without proper sustainability standards could prove a disaster, causing more environmental and human harm than good. The new WBGU report shows that a sustainable use of bioenergy is possible and outlines how opportunities can be exploited while at the same time minimizing risks. The report thus offers policy-makers valuable guidance for a sustainable bioenergy policy."

Achim Steiner, Executive Director of the United Nations Environment Programme (UNEP) (2006–2016)

"With its interdisciplinary approach, providing a complex and systematic analysis of the poverty-environment nexus, WBGU's latest report breaks new ground. Indira Gandhi's old, convenient maxim was 'Poverty is the biggest polluter'. Put forward at the 1972 UN Conference on the Human Environment in Stockholm, it has been sorely misused ever since to override environmental precaution and prioritize economic development strategies instead. The new WBGU report maps out a way to shape a coherent environment and development policy. This report revitalizes the Rio spirit and gives it a robust scientific base"

Ernst Ulrich von Weizsäcker, Member of the German Bundestag 1998–2005.

"The publication of 'World in Transition: Towards Sustainable Energy Systems' is timely indeed. The World Summit on Sustainable Development gave great attention to this challenge, but failed to agree on a quantitative, time-bound target for the introduction of renewable energy sources. The German Advisory Council on Global Change (WBGU) has now produced a report with a global focus; this is essential in view of the global impacts of climatic changes. The report provides a convincing long-term analysis; this, too, is essential, for global energy policies must take a long-term perspective, over a time frame of 50 to 100 years, while providing concrete guidance for decision makers to be implemented now. There is an urgent need to identify paths by which to secure energy supply for the 2.4 billion people who still depend upon traditional biomass, while keeping clearly in view the need to combine this challenge with the prevention of perilous climatic changes. Our one world must close the gap between industrialized countries' surfeit and developing countries' poverty. Policies will need to consider both the broader environmental and specific climate exigencies. I recommend this book very warmly to everyone concerned with global energy issues."

Klaus Töpfer, Executive Director of the United Nations Environment Programme (UNEP) from 1998 to 2006.

Public relations and events (selection)
In May 2012, WBGU hosted  a high-level international Symposium "Towards Low-Carbon Prosperity: National Strategies and International Partnerships" in Berlin. At this symposium a variety of important national approaches to the decarbonisation of energy systems and opportunities for innovative partnerships in the transition to low-carbon development were illuminated. The keynote was delivered by Chancellor Dr. Angela Merkel.

The WBGU report "World in Transition – A Social Contract for Sustainability" is available as an online seminar. The E-Course "World in Transition"of the WBGU has been produced in cooperation with the Virtual Academy for Sustainability. The aim is to provide freely available e-courses on sustainability at no charge for university students. This offer is directed at students of all faculties and can be integrated in general studies programmes as well as dedicated bachelor and master courses. The E-Course is also a contribution to the Science Year 2012 of the German Federal Ministry for Research and Education (BMBF) "Project Earth – Our Future". In 2015, the WBGU produced a cartoon, "Human Power – The concept of planetary guard rails", explaining the concept of planetary guardrails. On the occasion of the adoption of the post-2015 development agenda with its Sustainable Development Goals, WBGU Co chair Dirk Messner explains in a video the importance of planetary guard rails in implementing these goals.

In 2014 the flagship report "A Social Contract for Sustainability" was published in a comic version: "The Great Transformation: Climate – Can we beat the Heat?"  In 2015 the French version of this graphic novel has been published under the title "La Grande Transformation – Climat, inverserons-nous la courbe?".
In 2016 the comic "The urban planet – How cities save our future" has been published in three languages (German, English, Spanish).

In 2017 WBGU hosted the international conference "The transformative power of cities". Two Panels focused on "Do real estate markets lead to unjust cities?" and "Digital cities – Potential or Risk for Sustainable Development?". Speakers were amongst others Stefan Bone-Winkel, Shivani Chaudhry, Leilani Fahra, Barbara Hendricks, Dirk Messner, Saskia Sassen, John Schellnhuber and Carlo Ratti.

In preparation for the report "Our common digital future", the WBGU held in June 2018 a public consultation round on "Digitization and sustainability: What future do we want to shape?". The background was the paper "Digitization – what we need to talk about]". In 2018 the WBGU was co-host of the 26th EEAC Annual Conference "Towards a Sustainable Europe by 2030: Key leverages for transformation". The first public presentation of the report "Our common digital future" took place in April 2019 in cooperation with the KfW, a German state-owned development bank. The WBGU In July 2019, this report was presented at a side event of the United Nations High-Level Political Forum on Sustainable Development in New York at the German permanent mission, and in September, also in New York, at the SDG Summit. In December 2019, the WBGU organized the research conference "Shaping the Future – Digital and sustainable", (in German) in cooperation with the Ministry of Research ( BMBF) and the Weizenbaum-Institut.

Latest publications

External links 
Website of WBGU

Environmental organisations based in Germany